This is a list of the heritage sites in Beaufort West, Western Cape Province, South Africa, as recognized by the South African Heritage Resource Agency.

|}

References

Beaufort West
Tourist attractions in the Western Cape